Aminath Shaufa Saeed (9 November 1990) is a Maldivian singer.

Career
In 2007, Saeed appeared in one of the Television Maldives-created singing series shows, Thihan'dhaanugai, where she performed a cover of the song "Eynee Loabi", originally performed by Masodi Hassan Khaleel. Her voice was regarded as "somber", "husky" and "closed" yet "soulful", mostly comfortable in the lower vocal range. In 2008, she was nominated as the "Voice of Maldives", a singing competition where the winner gets to show up in Voice of India. She performed in the succeeding shows of Ehan'dhaanugai series including Thihan'dhaanugai Remix (2008) and Ehan'dhaanugai Duet (2009), where she rendered a remix cover version of the song "Vindhaa Hithaa" originally performed by Sultans Band, for the former and a duet song "Balamun Midhaa" for the latter with Ahmed Amir. She next performed the slow paced romantic song "Vindhu Hithaa" for the film E Dharifulhu (2009), alongside Mohamed Abdul Ghanee, which was nominated as the Best Duet Song in Maldives Video Music Awards 2010. This was followed by her collaboration with Hassan Ilham for the upbeat dance song "Udhabaani" from Udhabaani (2009).

In 2010, she was part of the vocal ensemble in the song "Annaashey Hinithun Velamaa" from Dhin Veynuge Hithaamaigaa (2010), the child abuse awareness song "Veeraana" from Veeraana, "Vindhaa Kulhey" from Niuma (2010) and "Vaahandhaanakun Rovenee" from Vaahan'dhaanakun 2. For the latter, released as a memoire for late legend Naifaru Dhohokko, she recorded an additional track "Giritee Loabin", all of which were well received by audience and critics. The year marks her last appearance in the Ehan'dhaanugai series, by performing the cover version of Nethuneehey Miadhu Beynun, alongside Hassan Jalaal. Also, she collaborated with Jalaal and Mira Mohamed Majid, serving as a coach for the contestants for Raajje Ran Adu in 2010. The following year, she was heard in only one song "Lafzu Thakey" from Sazaa (2011).

Discography

Feature film

Short film

Non-film songs

Filmography

Accolades

References 

Living people
People from Malé
1990 births
Maldivian playback singers